Tropical Storm Irving, known in the Philippines as Tropical Depression Edeng, was an early-season tropical cyclone that struck southern Japan during August 1992. A distinct but weak low-pressure area developed within the Western Pacific monsoon trough. A tropical depression formed on July 31, and following an increase in both organization and thunderstorm activity, the depression attained tropical storm intensity on the morning of August 2. After tracking west-northwest and then north, Irving turned to the northeast, and attained peak intensity a day later. In response to a subtropical ridge to the north, the system began to track west-northwestward, and made landfall at maximum intensity over southwestern Shikoku at peak intensity. Irving turned sharply to the west and rapidly weakened, dissipating over the Korea Strait at noon on August 5.

Tropical Storm Irving was the first of two successive systems to move over the Japanese archipelago. Two people were reported missing in Wakayama prefecture. A swimmer was reported missing and two other people were killed offshore Kyōtango due to high waves. Overall, 51 flights linking Osaka and Shikoku were cancelled while ferry services between the Kansai region and Shikoku were also suspended. Damage was estimated at 601 million (US$4.74 million).

Meteorological history

The final tropical cyclone to develop during July 1992, Tropical Storm Irving originated from a distinct but weak low-pressure area embedded in the Western Pacific monsoon trough that extended from the South China Sea to the central Philippine Sea. The Joint Typhoon Warning Center (JTWC) starting following the system at 06:00 UTC on July 30. Thunderstorm activity steadily increased; however, multiple low-level circulations remained present. On July 31, the Japan Meteorological Agency (JMA) upgraded the system into a tropical depression. The development of curved cloud lines on satellite imagery prompted to the JTWC to issue a Tropical Cyclone Formation Alert at 08:02 UTC. Following an improvement of the system's structure, the JTWC upgraded the system into a tropical depression, and the first warning was issued. A hurricane hunter aircraft investigated the system and discovered that the low-level circulation was  further north than what was inferred from the satellite data. The depression slowly tracked northward near the western periphery of a subtropical ridge. Early on August 2, the JMA classified the depression as a tropical storm. Meanwhile, the JTWC upgraded the depression into Tropical Storm Irving, based on an increase in atmospheric convection near the center and Dvorak satellite estimates.

After tracking north-northeast, Irving then turned northeast. On the morning of August 3, the JMA upgraded Irving into a severe tropical storm. According to the JTWC, the cyclone attained typhoon intensity that evening. At the time of peak intensity, visible satellite imagery showed an elliptic eye  in diameter. With a subtropical ridge established to the north, the tropical cyclone began to track west-northwestward. Upon making landfall over southwestern Shikoku at peak intensity, Irving turned sharply to the west and rapidly weakened. The JTWC and JMA downgraded Irving to a tropical storm on August 4 as it interacted with land. After weakening to a tropical depression later that day, Irving dissipated over the Korea Strait near Pusan. The JMA ceased watching the remnants of the system midday on August 5.

Impact
Tropical Storm Irving was the first of two successive systems to move over the Japanese archipelago, with Typhoon Jannis succeeding it. The storm dropped heavy rainfall across much of the Japanese archipelago. A peak rainfall total of  occurred at Nagaoka District. During a 24-hour time period,  fell in Hidegadake.

Across Tokushima Prefecture, there were four landslides and roads were cut in two places. Two people suffered injuries in Kōchi Prefecture. Roads were cut in 89 spots and 1,180 customers lost power for half an hour. Strong winds also downed many trees and all transport in the prefecture was halted. Irving passed quite close to Oita Prefecture; however, the storm's small size limited damage. Twenty-five flights were cancelled at Fukuoka Airport and two more were cancelled at Kitakyushu Airport. Ten ferries were cancelled in Fukuoka Prefecture. Roads were damaged in 17 spots in Wakayama prefecture, where two people were reported missing due to rough seas. Two Okayama Airport flights were cancelled. A swimmer was reported missing and two other individuals were killed offshore Kyōtango due to high waves. Overall, 51 flights linking Osaka and Shikoku were cancelled and ferry services between the Kansai region and Shikoku were also suspended. Damage was estimated at ¥601 million.

See also

Tropical Storm Harry (1991) - similar early-season tropical cyclone that struck Japan

Notes

References

I
I
I
I